The florin (sign: Afl.; code: AWG) or Aruban guilder is the currency of Aruba. It is subdivided into 100 cents. The florin was introduced in 1986, replacing the Netherlands Antillean guilder at par. The Aruban florin is pegged to the United States dollar at the rate of 1.79 florin per USD. US dollars are frequently accepted as payment at the rate of 1.75 florin per USD.

Coins
In 1986, coins were introduced in denominations of 5, 10, 25 and 50 cents and 1 and  florin. Later, the 5 florin banknote was replaced by a square coin and the  florin coin was removed from circulation. The 5 florin was replaced in 2005 with a round gold-coloured coin, because the old square 5 florin coin was too easy to counterfeit. All coins are struck in nickel-bonded steel with exception of the 5 florin, which is an alloy of copper and other metals. The 50 cent is the only square-shaped coin remaining, also commonly referred to as a "yotin" by the locals.

On the back of each 1,  and 5-florin coin is a profile view of the current head of state of the Kingdom of the Netherlands. From 1986 to 2013, this was Queen Beatrix and since 2014 it has been King Willem-Alexander. Moreover, only these three denominations have writing on their edge, namely "God Zij Met Ons" meaning 'God Be With Us'.

Banknotes
The Central Bank of Aruba (Centrale Bank van Aruba) introduced banknotes in denominations of 5, 10, 25, 50 and 100 florin and dated January 1, 1986. In 1990, the bank issued the same denominations in a colorful new family of notes designed by Aruban artist Evelino Fingal. As director of the Archaeological Museum, Fingal found inspiration in old Indian paintings and pot shards. Fingal combined decorative motifs found on pre-Columbian pottery with pictures of animals unique to the island. The 500-florin notes were introduced in 1993, with the 5-florin note replaced by a square coin in 1995.

As of 2003 a new print was started of the then already existing banknotes of 10, 25, 50, 100 and 500 florin. These new banknotes were made with new safety features to counteract counterfeiting, but retained their look.

In 2019, the Centrale Bank van Aruba unveiled a new series of banknotes in denominations of 10, 25, 50, 100 and 200 florin, with the latter serving as a new denomination. The theme presented for this series is "Life in Aruba", as it contains elements of Aruban flora, fauna, cultural heritage, monuments and landmarks. They were issued on June 4, 2019, and is circulating alongside the 2003 series until August 11, after which the 2003 series of banknotes were no longer legal tender. Commercial banks in Aruba accepted the 2003 series of banknotes until December 4, afterward the notes will be redeemed at the Central Bank of Aruba for up to 30 years, until August 11, 2049. The 100 Florin note was awarded "2019 Banknote of the Year" by The International Banknote Society for its content, art, and security features.

Current exchange rates

See also
Economy of Aruba
Central banks and currencies of the Caribbean

Notes

External links
 Banknotes of Aruba
Banknotes of Aruba
 Nos Florin (in Dutch)

 
 

Currencies introduced in 1986
Currencies of the Caribbean
Currencies of the Kingdom of the Netherlands
Florin
Fixed exchange rate